Tullio Moneta (9 May 1937 – 31 March 2022) was an Italian actor and mercenary. He acted in 15 films between 1970 and 1990, starring in the feature film The Lion's Share. He was, together with Mike Hoare, the military advisor for the film The Wild Geese (1978).

In November 1981 Moneta was second-in-command to Mike Hoare when the latter led the 1981 Seychelles coup d'état attempt at Mahe Airport in the Seychelles and was sentenced to five years in prison; he was released soon after. 

Moneta latterly lived in Durban, South Africa. He died on 31 March 2022, at the age of 84.

References

External links 

 

1937 births
2022 deaths
South African male television actors
South African mercenaries
Actors from Durban
Italian emigrants to South Africa
White South African people
Italian South African